The Revanche was a  of the French Navy.

The French burnt their captures.

On 12 March 1811, Revanche and  captured the British sloop .

References

Age of Sail frigates of France
Romaine-class frigates
1795 ships
Ships built in France